Sammy White (born March 3, 1954) is an American former professional football player who was a wide receiver for 10 seasons with the Minnesota Vikings of the National Football League (NFL).

After playing college football at Grambling State University, White was selected in the second round of the 1976 NFL Draft by Minnesota, and won the Associated Press Offensive Rookie of the Year and UPI NFL-NFC Rookie of the Year awards in 1976. He was a two-time Pro Bowl selection in 1976 and 1977. In 128 career games, he totaled 393 receptions, 6,400 receiving yards, and 50 touchdowns.

College career

White played at Grambling from 1972-1975, playing on the same team as future NFL quarterback and Super Bowl XXII MVP Doug Williams during his final two seasons.  He was a first-team All-Southwestern Athletic Conference selection in 1973 and 1975.  As a senior, White caught 37 passes for 802 yards and 17 touchdowns.

Notoriety
White holds the single-game receiving yards record for the Minnesota Vikings with 210 yards (1976)<https://www.statmuse.com/nfl/ask/most-receiving-yard-in-a-game-by-a-vikings-player>. One of the most spectacular and ferocious hits in NFL history happened to White during Super Bowl XI, held on January 9, 1977 at the Rose Bowl in Pasadena, California. During a 3rd and long play, Fran Tarkenton dropped deep into the pocket and delivered a bullet to White who was on crossing route, with Oakland Raiders DB Skip Thomas meeting him in the middle. As White made a spectacular catch on the ball, he was hit by Raiders safety Jack Tatum, while Thomas closed the gap. The collision knocked White's helmet and chin strap off, sending the helmet tumbling about eight yards backwards from where they landed. Although shaken on the play, he held onto the ball gaining the Vikings a first down. He would return to the game, however the Vikings were outscored 32-14 and the Raiders would win their first of 3 Super Bowls.  White finished the game as the Vikings' leading receiver with 5 receptions for 77 yards and a touchdown. White, along with Randy Moss and Justin Jefferson, are the only wide receivers to make the Pro Bowl in their first two seasons with the Vikings.

After retirement
After receiving an invitation to join the coaching staff at Grambling State from his old teammate Doug Williams, who became GSU's head coach in 1998, White worked as a receivers coach (1998-2003 and 2007-2009) and offensive coordinator (2004-2006). During that time Grambling won six Western Division titles and five SWAC championships. White was inducted into the SWAC Hall of Fame in 2004.

References

1954 births
Living people
American football wide receivers
Grambling State Tigers football players
Minnesota Vikings players
National Conference Pro Bowl players
National Football League Offensive Rookie of the Year Award winners
People from Winnsboro, Louisiana
Players of American football from Louisiana